Ottoa is a monotypic genus of flowering plants belonging to the family Apiaceae. It only contains one known species, Ottoa oenanthoides. 

Its native range is from southern Mexico to Venezuela and Ecuador. It is also found in Colombia, Costa Rica, Guatemala, and Panamá.

The genus name of Ottoa is in honour of Christoph Friedrich Otto (1783–1856), a German gardener and botanist. The Latin specific epithet of oenanthoides means one that resembles a member of the genus OenantheL.
Both the genus and the species were first described and published in F.W.H.von Humboldt, A.J.A.Bonpland & C.S.Kunth, Nov. Gen. Sp. Vol.5 on page 20 in 1821.

Essential oils have been extracted by hydrodistillation methods from leaves and roots of Otto''.

References

Apioideae
Monotypic Apioideae genera